Monica Covacci (born December 8, 1971 in Agincourt, Ontario) is a Canadian former artistic gymnast. She competed at the 1988 Summer Olympics.

References

1971 births
Living people
Canadian female artistic gymnasts
Gymnasts at the 1988 Summer Olympics
Olympic gymnasts of Canada
Sportspeople from Scarborough, Toronto
Sportspeople from Richmond Hill, Ontario
Gymnastics coaches
Canadian sports coaches